"Uh Huh" is the first single by R&B group B2K, from their self-titled debut album. The song was released in July 2001 and it peaked at number 37 on the Billboard Hot 100 and number 20 on the Hot R&B/Hip-Hop Songs. It also peaked at number 35 in the UK on its first entry and reached a new peak at number 31 on a re-release.

Music video
In the music video, directed by Erik White, the guys are dancing in a room with a background of speakers and they are wearing zipped vests showing their bodies in the video. There are also girls dancing in the video. It also features Jhene Aiko (who at the time was marketed as Lil' Fizz's cousin).

Charts

Weekly charts

Year-end charts

References

2001 songs
2001 debut singles
B2K songs
Epic Records singles
Song recordings produced by Tricky Stewart
Songs written by Traci Hale
Songs written by Tricky Stewart
Music videos directed by Erik White